Vatukoula FA was a Fijian football team playing in the second division of the Fiji Football Association competitions. It is based on the island of  Viti Levu.

 The Team was run by the Following:

  Manager   =  Barma Nand
  Treasurer =  Mahendar Sen

Their uniform includes orange shirt with white.

History 
The Vodafone Vatukoula Football Association was formed in 1979, under the presidency of Umesh Chandra

De-registered 
On 25 May 2017, Vatukoula Football Association was de-registered as an affiliated member of the Fiji Football Association, as a result of compliance issues relating to club competitions and poor performances, as the club was thrashed 29-nil by Tailevu Naitasiri F.C. in a Vodafone Senior League match, players who hold Vatukoula district licence were allowed t0 play for Tavua F.C. as Vatukoula and Tavua become one district.

See also 
 Fiji Football Association

References

Bibliography 
 M. Prasad, Sixty Years of Soccer in Fiji 1938 – 1998: The Official History of the Fiji Football Association, Fiji Football Association, Suva, 1998.

Football clubs in Fiji
1979 establishments in Fiji
Association football clubs established in 1979